Alfred William "Al" Stiller (August 26, 1923 – April 20, 2004) was an American cyclist. He competed in the tandem and team pursuit events at the 1948 Summer Olympics.

References

External links
 

1923 births
2004 deaths
American male cyclists
Olympic cyclists of the United States
Cyclists at the 1948 Summer Olympics
Cyclists from Chicago
American track cyclists